Hadiya may refer to :

 Hadiya Zone,  a Zone in the Ethiopian Southern Nations, Nationalities, and Peoples' Region (SNNPR)
 Hadiya Sultanate, an ancient kingdom located in South Western Ethiopia
 Hadiyya language, a language spoken by the Hadiyya people of Ethiopia
 Hadiya, Nepal, a village development committee in South-Eastern Nepal
 Hadiya people, an Ethiopian ethnic group
 Hadiyah, a village in Northern Syria
 Hadiya Khalaf Abbas, a Syrian politician
 Death of Hadiya Pendleton, murder of an American teenager
 Hadiya court case, a landmark Supreme Court of India case
 Hadiya Hossana FC, an Ethiopian football club
 Adham Hadiya, a former Arab-Israeli footballer

Language and nationality disambiguation pages